The Seattle Police Department (SPD) is the principal law enforcement agency of the city of Seattle, Washington, United States, except for the campus of the University of Washington, which is under the responsibility of its own police department. The SPD is nationally accredited by the Commission on Accreditation for Law Enforcement Agencies.

Law enforcement in Seattle began with the election of John T. Jordan as town marshal in 1870. The SPD was officially organized on June 2, 1869. Today it has a number of specialty units including SWAT, bike patrol, harbor patrol, motorcycles, mounted patrols, and a variety of detective units; Fifty-eight officers have died in the line of duty since the SPD's establishment.

The SPD has been under federal oversight since 2012, when policy and procedural reforms were instituted after a United States Department of Justice investigation found that SPD officers routinely used excessive force.

Patrolmen are represented by the Seattle Police Officers' Guild in labor negotiations.

Command structure 
 Chief of Police: Adrian Z. Diaz
 Deputy Chief: This position is currently vacant.  A nationwide hiring process began in early 2023.
 Chief Operating Officer: Brian Maxey
 Assistant Chief–Patrol Operations Bureau: Thomas Mahaffey
 Assistant Chief–Criminal Investigations Bureau: Deanna Nollette
 Assistant Chief–Professional Standards Bureau: Lesley Cordner
 Assistant Chief–Collaborative Policing:  Eric Greening
 Assistant Chief- Metropolitan Bureau: Todd Kibbee
 Assistant Chief–Special Operations Bureau: Eric Barden
 Assistant Chief: Bryan Grenon
 Assistant Chief–Homeland Security: Captain Bryan Grenon
 Executive Director–Legal Affairs: Attorney Rebecca Boatright
 Executive Director-Human Resources: Mike Fields
 Executive Director–Administration: CAO Valarie Anderson
 Executive Director–Budget and Finance: Executive Director Angela Socci
 Executive Director of Strategic Initiatives: Chief Strategic Advisor Christopher Fisher

Rank structure and insignia 

Sergeant Major Arnold "Arny" McGinnis (retired in 2012) is the only known SPD member to hold the rank.*

Promotions 
After three years in patrol, officers can become candidates to transfer to a wide variety of specialty units and are also eligible to attend a weeklong detective school. After five years as a police officer, they can take a promotional examination. Every other year, civil service tests are administered for promotions. Tests are given for the rank of sergeant, lieutenant, and captain. Assistant and deputy chiefs are appointed by the chief from the management ranks. Officers may be promoted to sergeant after five years of experience with the department and passing the sergeant's exam. Lieutenants must have at least three years' experience as sergeants, and captains must have at least three years' experience as lieutenants. A bachelor's degree may substitute for one year of experience but can only be used for one promotional exam.

History 

The department was established in the 1880s after a lynching and a number of race riots. By 1896, there were 43 police officers.

The State of Washington prohibited alcohol in 1916. Police Lieutenant Roy Olmstead began a bootlegging operation. In March 1920 he was arrested by Federal probations agents and was fired from his job with the department. He went on to run a very profitable operation. He enjoyed a very good reputation for his integrity as a rum-runner and was active in the community. He was convicted in 1921 with twenty others in an early case that used telephone wiretaps. He was released in 1931 and pardoned by President Franklin D. Roosevelt in 1935.

In June 1924, Bertha Landes served as acting mayor while Edwin J. Brown was out of the city to attend the marathon Democratic National Convention. In a newspaper story Police Chief William Severyns said that the department had at least a hundred corrupt officers. Mayor Landes ordered the chief to fire one hundred officers. He refused. Landes fired him. Mayor Brown rushed back to the city to reverse Mayor Landes' actions.

In 1926, Chief Severyns described to the Seattle Union Record police brutality that included questioning suspects in a rowboat in Lake Washington with a heavy weight tied around their necks.

In July 1935, the city council held hearings on the many gambling and prostitution dens in the city. The police chief claimed he had no knowledge of such activities in the city. Councilman Fred Hamley walked with the chief onto Fourth Avenue to an establishment that featured a roulette wheel and handed him an ax. The chief remained in office.

In the autumn of 1947, police Chief George Eastman reassigned the police captain in charge of suppressing illegal alcohol sales after complaints such establishments were running openly. The chief took no steps to otherwise discipline the man.

In November 1969, police Chief Frank Ramon retired after accusations that he had tried to stifle an investigation into gambling and government corruption.

On June 21, 1974, a Seattle Police helicopter on its way to a shooting collided with a Cessna plane near Boeing Field. Both officers on board and both civilians in the plane were killed.

In 1987, the Seattle Police Department created the modern mountain bike patrol units, paving the way for cities across North America to follow.

In 2011, the United States Justice Department found that the department had engaged in a pattern of constitutional violations in its use of force.

In 2012, the rank of "Sergeant Major" was created and bestowed upon then-Sergeant Arnold "Arny" McGinnis. Sergeant Major McGinnis started working at the Seattle Police Department in 1962, holding the rank of police officer. He retired in July 2012 at the age of 75, reaching fifty years of service to the city of Seattle. He is the only member of the SPD known to hold the rank.

On May 19, 2014, Kathleen O'Toole was nominated to serve as Chief of the Seattle Police Department and was officially appointed on June 23, 2014. In 2015, O'Toole and others in the department developed and implemented a data-oriented policing strategy called "Agile Policing Strategy", influenced by agile manufacturing. The approach was developed to increase the responsiveness or agility of the department to address crime and disorder problems through the real-time surfacing, visualization, analysis, and sharing of data across all necessary operational units of the police department. Organizationally, this was accomplished through the SPD's Real Time Crime Center, established in July 2015 using a combination of asset forfeiture funds and a federal government grant, which houses the technology, analytical support and command structure.

2020 George Floyd protests 

On Sunday May 31, 2020, the department blockaded the streets around the East Precinct which was located at the intersection of 12th Ave E and E Pine. They did this before a protest march approached the precinct. The march moved on after a short while. On Monday June 1 a much larger group of thousands marched from Westlake Plaza to the intersection of 11th Ave E and E Pine where the street was blockaded. This day the march did not move on. After several hours the police ordered the group to disperse. When they did not they tear gassed the protestors. A similar gathering formed the next night. This was also ordered to disperse and tear gassed. 
On June 3, Mayor Jenny Durkan lifted the curfew that had been in effect since May 30.
On June 5, Mayor Durkan banned the use of tear gas for 30 days without the approval of the Police Chief.
On Saturday June 6, the police again used pepper spray and non-tear gas explosives to try to disperse demonstrators. Seattle City Council member Kshama Sawant said “The police had come prepared to inflict violence without provocation.” By this time protestors had coalesced around demands of defunding of the police department by at least 50 percent, an expansion of investments in black and brown communities, and releasing all protestors. 
Nightly protests continued until June 7 when the crowd was again dispersed by flash bangs and tear gas, which the police said was in response to protesters throwing projectiles at officers. On Monday June 8 the police boarded up the precinct and withdrew from the building. Later that night residents declared "Free Capitol Hill".

On June 17, 2020, King County Labor Council delegates voted to expel the Seattle Police Officers Guild from the organization, following a demand pushed by many protesters.

On August 11, 2020, it was announced that Police Chief Carmen Best would retire, effective September 2, 2020. Deputy Chief Adrian Z. Diaz succeeded Best in an interim capacity and was appointed to the permanent position on September 20, 2022.

Controversies and misconduct

Before 2000 
In June 1901, Police Chief William L. Meredith was forced to resign by a Seattle City Council investigation that found he had taken bribes and allowed illegal gambling operations to flourish. Meredith then ambushed one of his accusers in a local drugstore with a shotgun and pistol. It went badly for him and he was killed by John Considine, his intended victim.

In 1911, Police Chief Charles W Wappenstein was ousted by a reform-minded mayor. He was convicted on state charges related to bribery, prostitution, and other vices. In December 1913, Governor Ernest Lister granted him a pardon. He died in 1931.

In January 1967, the Seattle Times ran a series of stories revealing a long-standing and widespread culture of corruption in the police department. Gambling dens, illegal bars and gay clubs were forced to pay protection to the local patrolman who kept half and passed to his sergeant who in turn kept half and passed the remainder along.

Former homicide detective, Earl “Sonny” Davis, was accused of stealing at least $11,400 on Oct. 1, 1996, from the belongings of an elderly man, Bodegard Mitchell, who was fatally shot by police during a standoff at a South Seattle apartment. Davis' ex-partner, Cloyd Steiger, testified he saw Davis pocket a bundle of cash - which Steiger initially believed to be about $100 - while the two were searching the apartment for evidence. Steiger further testified Davis asked him if he had a problem with taking money, referred to it as a "squad thing".

In 1999, Seattle hosted the World Trade Organization Ministerial Conference. The Seattle Police Department was criticized for failing to properly prepare for protest activity involving over 100,000 protesters that disrupted the conference. While the majority of protestors were not violent, some assaulted delegates and police, and destroyed property. The protest soon devolved into a riot. In response, SPD used chemical agents and less-lethal weapons in an attempt to restore order. News footage of this response and of the rioting was broadcast worldwide. No protesters or police officers were injured seriously enough during the riot to require hospitalization. Chief Norm Stamper resigned amid the scrutiny of police response to the event.

2000s 
In 2001, riots broke out downtown during the Mardi Gras celebrations. The riots resulted in one death, more than 70 hospitalizations, and 21 arrests.

In July of the same year, Officer Jess Pitts stopped a group of 14 Asian-American students and instructors for jaywalking in the International District. The students alleged that Pitts lined them up against a wall and detained them for around 45 minutes while repeatedly asking if they spoke English. An instructor Andrew Cho claimed that another officer on the scene Officer Larry Brotherton said to him "I've been to your country before, when I was in the Army", incorrectly assuming Cho was Vietnamese. Only one student was issued a citation, which was later dismissed. The student's attorney noted that because she said to Pitts "You wouldn't have stopped us if we had blond hair" and was the only one issued a citation, this showed that the ticket was issued in response to her antagonizing the officer, rather than for jaywalking. The Office of Police Accountability (OPA) later sustained a single allegation of unprofessionalism against Pitts.

The Seattle Police Officers' Guild membership later overwhelmingly passed a vote of no confidence in Chief Gil Kerlikowske, citing a double standard where Officer Pitts, a beat officer, was publicly criticized for the jaywalking incident but upper-level personnel were not held responsible for failures in handling the Mardi Gras riots.

Former detective Dale Nixdorf resigned after an OPA investigation sustained a complaint claiming that he sexually harassed and assaulted a woman who sought help after a domestic violence incident in 2003. According to a lawsuit filed in 2006, Nixdorf was assigned to drive her home and install one of the department's temporary alarm systems after the incident. Over the next couple weeks, Nixdorf allegedly called and visited her home repeatedly, claiming to be checking on the security system while making sexually aggressive comments and asking for sex each time. The lawsuit also claimed that Nixdorf grabbed her buttocks and forced her to fondle him over his jeans.

On May 22, 2009, SPD officer and hostage negotiator Eugene Schubeck shot Nathaniel Caylor in the face. Police were responding to a report that Caylor was suicidal and had locked himself in his apartment with his son. Caylor was speaking to Schubeck from his patio, and was shot when he attempted to re-enter his apartment. In June 2015, the resulting use-of-force lawsuit was settled for $1.975 million, the largest such settlement in the city's history.

2010s 
In August 2010, SPD officer Ian Birk shot and killed Native American woodcarver John T. Williams. Subsequent grand jury findings on the level of threat posed by Williams were inconclusive but an internal review of the shooting by the SPD's Firearms Review Commission found the shooting "unjustified" and cited Birk's tactical mishandling of the confrontation as being responsible for Williams' death. Birk resigned from the department, though prosecutor Dan Satterberg declined to file charges, prompting a protest by Williams' family and supporters.

In 2010, detectives from SPD's Gang Unit ordered two Latino men suspected of committing a crime to lie on the ground, where they were kicked and verbally assaulted; the incident was captured on a bystander's cellphone video. The police let the men go soon afterwards; the video prompted protests over racial tensions and a police department internal investigation. Several officers were suspended without pay and/or demoted, but not criminally charged. A civil lawsuit by one of the two men has been filed. It was settled later in 2012 for $100,000.

In December 2011, the SPD was subject to a U.S. Department of Justice investigation that found officers had violated the 14th Amendment and the Violent Crime Control and Law Enforcement Act of 1994. The DOJ found that SPD officers engaged in a pattern of excessive use of force that violated the Constitution as well as Federal law. Furthermore, the regular invocation of the Garrity v. New Jersey protection was found to have reduced the department's ability to supervise the use of force and hinder investigations. A spokesman for the SPD indicated they will fully comply with the DOJ inquiry to avoid a federal lawsuit. In late July 2012, the city and Department of Justice reached a settlement that included improved oversight, training and reporting.

On 6 October 2012, Officer Eric Faust beat a man he was attempting to detain. In September 2013, as a result of an internal investigation, the department suspended Faust for eight days without pay.

On 13 July 2013, the department fired Lieutenant Donnie Lowe due to misconduct characterized as domestic violence and dishonesty.

On 30 July 2013, Officer John Marion, threatened a reporter who was observing a number of policemen making an arrest. An internal investigation of Marion's behavior confirmed his actions. He was given a single day of unpaid suspension.

In August 2013, the city agreed to pay two brothers $38,500 for a case of abuse. The two men claimed they were targeted by Officer Michael Waters because he was upset at how they had treated him at a local bar. According to the claim, Waters and his partner used the pretext of looking for two bank robbers to humiliate and assault the two men. Although the city agreed to settle the matter, neither officer was punished and they continue on the force.

In January 2014, Detective David Blackmer plead guilty to stalking his mistress after she threatened to reveal their relationship to his wife. He was sentenced to 90 days in jail. An internal police investigation was then launched to determine whether he should be fired.

In July 2014, Officer Cynthia Whitlatch arrested William Wingate, a black pedestrian who had a golf club that he was using as a cane. She falsely claimed that Wingate had swung his cane at her and he was charged with obstruction and harassment and spent a night in jail. When video showed he had done nothing to provoke the officer, the police department apologized in January 2015. Whitlatch was later fired by Chief O'Toole.

In March 2015, Officer Peter Leutz was fired after an investigation found that he sent three women he met on duty over 100 text messages in pursuit of romantic relationships. In a written letter to Leutz, Police Chief Kathleen O'Toole wrote that he engaged in "serious and repeated abuse of authority, and an unsettling pattern of behavior, some of it directed at women who [he] knew from the outset, or learned early on, may have been especially vulnerable given turmoil in their personal lives."

In November 2016, Officer Adley Shepherd was fired after he punched a drunk, handcuffed woman who kicked him while he was putting her into the back of his police car. An arbitrator on the Disciplinary Review Board later attempted to reduce the firing to a 15-day suspension, but was overruled by a King County Superior Court judge. The case was again appealed to the Court of Appeals which upheld the previous ruling, writing that the arbitrator's decision to overturn Shepherd's firing "sends a message to officers that a violation of a clear and specific policy is not that serious if the officer is dealing with a difficult subject, losing patience, or passionate in believing that he or she did nothing wrong — however mistaken that belief may be."

In March 2017, a duffel bag in the South Precinct was found containing a handgun reported stolen in 1990.

In May 2018, Officer Matthew Kerby drove to a West Seattle house in search of a man who allegedly drove away from a minor collision. When he found that the man was not home, he falsely told a woman at the home that the man had been involved in a hit-and-run in which a woman involved might not survive. This led to a chain of events which culminated in the man's suicide in June of that year. Kerby was later suspended for six days without pay.

In July 2018, officers Kenneth Martin and Tabitha Sexton were fired after an October 2017 incident in which they shot 27 rounds into a fleeing car in Eastlake.

In October 2018, Sergeant Frank Poblocki was demoted to officer after he sat for 40 minutes outside the workplace of a man who cursed him and called him names. Witnesses say he referred to this behavior as community policing.

In February 2019, the city agreed to pay Alonzo Price-Holt $100,001, as well as $58,989 in attorney fees, to settle a federal lawsuit that alleged excessive use of force by Officer Zsolt Dornay. Footage from the holding cell shows Officer Dornay tackling Price-Holt, who had his hands handcuffed behind his back. Dornay was also given 30 days of unpaid leave as a result of the incident. Dornay had previously been convicted of drunk driving.

2020s 

In January 2020, Officer Duane Goodman was fired for his Instagram posts, which a report by the Office of Police Accountability described as using "extreme profane language" and posts that ranted against "illegal immigration" and "appeared to endorse violence" against Hillary Clinton and Barack Obama. The department contacted the U.S. Secret Service, who interviewed Goodman, after he captioned an image of a package bomb with the message, "I don't condone sending package bombs but god it would be nice for Killary and Anti-cop Obama to finally STFU! Maybe Obama will stop lying and claiming the good economy is from him."

In February 2020, Officer Todd Novisedlak was fired after an investigation by the OPA which cited his physically abusing his ex-girlfriend, his marijuana use, and his repeatedly making discriminatory and derogatory remarks against others based on race, sexual orientation, and gender. This follows a 2015 court case, settled by the city, in which a man was jailed for a week after a kidnapping victim "positively identified" a license photograph, shown to her by Novisedlak, of a man with the same name as one of the suspects.

In the same month, it was reported that Lieutenant Sina Ebinger, who led the city's Navigation Team, used the city contractor which clears encampments to remove personal garbage from her home. An investigation by the Office of Police Accountability found that in addition to using city resources for personal benefit, she told investigators several different versions of her story and deleted her entire text and browsing history and phone log. After the OPA findings were released, she retired from the department in lieu of termination.

In May 2020, during the George Floyd protests in Washington state, while Seattle police were attempting to detain looters, a white suspect was restrained with an officer's knee on his neck for 13 seconds while bystanders urged the officer to stop. This continued until a second officer intervened to push the first officer's knee to the suspect's back. This was documented on video. George Floyd himself had died after being restrained with a knee on his neck during an arrest. According to The Huffington Post, further video footage showed that the same Seattle officer had just used his knee on the neck of another white looting suspect.

In June 2020, a Federal Judge in Seattle ordered local police to stop using tear gas, pepper spray, stun grenade, "rubber bullets", and other force against non-violent protestors, finding that the Seattle Police had used excessive force against demonstrators, violating their right to free speech.

An investigation by the South Seattle Emerald in July 2020 found that at least eight SPD officers violated department policy and possibly election law by registering to vote at their precinct address, as opposed to their residential address. After the OPA investigation concluded, five officers (including the Seattle Police Officers Guild president Mike Solan) received written reprimands or 1 day suspensions.

Police union president Mike Solan faced calls for him to resign after falsely claiming that the January 6 United States Capitol attack was at least partially the fault of Black Lives Matter and other left-wing activists in early January 2021. At least two SPD officers who attended the riot or the preceding rally were placed on administrative leave. SPD officers Alexander Everett and Caitlin Rochelle, a married couple, were later fired after an OPA investigation found that they trespassed onto Capitol grounds during the attack.

In September 2021, the city of Seattle settled a lawsuit for $250,000 after officers entered the home of a 74-year-old man during a 2019 welfare check, held him at gunpoint, and forcefully arrested him. A previous OPA investigation into the incident had concluded that allegations of excessive force were unfounded and consistent with department policy.

An OPA investigation released in January 2022 revealed that during the George Floyd protests in June 2020, SPD officers faked radio chatter about armed Proud Boys heading toward the area that would later be known as the Capitol Hill Occupied Protest (CHOP). According to OPA Director Myerberg, this "improperly added fuel to the fire and could have had dire results." The investigation did not sustain allegations against any officers identified in the radio transmissions but instead against two supervisors who had already left the department. This revelation followed several other instances of misinformation from the department during the 2020 protests, such as claims of extortion in the CHOP area and a SPD tweet claiming pictured candles were improvised explosives thrown by protesters at police.

In April 2022, the Seattle Office of the Inspector General (OIG) released a report that found that the OPA routinely dismissed complaints against officers who violated the mask mandate by calling it a systemic issue to be addressed by the department rather than a matter for individual discipline. None of the 98 mask-related allegations reviewed by the OIG were sustained by OPA, even as officers repeatedly violated the mandate. The report also noted that the department was previously fined $5,400 in February 2021 by the Washington Department of Labor and Industries for mask violations but was forced to drop the case after officers used tactics to prolong OPA investigations into the allegations.

In October 2021, Twitter user @WhiteRoseAFA posted a thread that linked an anonymous Twitter account to Officer Andrei Constantin and listed screenshots of several offensive tweets from the account including posts that celebrated violence against protesters, taunted a grieving mother, and stated George Floyd "got justice". Constantin was fired from the department in September 2022 after the ensuing OPA investigation concluded. In the disciplinary action report explaining the termination, Police Chief Adrian Diaz also pointed to Constantin's history of disciplinary issues, including two suspensions, as contributing to the determination.

An OPA investigation issued in August 2022 alleged that an SPD commander brought window blinds, a sleeping cot, and a mattress to the office and would regularly sleep in his office while on duty. He resigned from the department before he could be disciplined and declined to be interviewed for the investigation.

In January 2023, an officer responding to an overdose call struck and killed 23-year-old student Jaahnavi Kandula as she was crossing Dexter Avenue in a marked crosswalk on Thomas Street. The department did not confirm that Kandula had died until 18 hours after the collision and declined to provide information about the involved officer or the speed at which he was driving. A department spokeswoman stated that the officer would not be reporting to his next shift but would instead take a "release day" following a "traumatic or upsetting" event.

Sidearm 
A majority of SPD officers carry semi-automatic pistols of various make and caliber. The SPD authorizes numerous pistols for carry, including ones made by Glock, Smith & Wesson, Springfield Armory, Inc., Heckler & Koch, Walther, Beretta, SIG-Sauer and Ruger. The most common sidearm chosen by officers of the SPD are various Glock models, such as the Glock Model 17 in 9mm, Model 22 in .40 S&W, and the Model 21 in .45 ACP. The compact Glock Model 19 in 9 mm and Model 23 in .40 are also used by officers.

However, while the majority of officers carry automatics, double-action revolvers produced by Smith & Wesson, Ruger, Colt and Taurus are also authorized for carry, in .38 Special, .357 Magnum and .45 ACP.

AR-15s and shotguns are also issued to patrol officers after additional required qualification(s). Specialty units including SWAT utilize select fire suppressed rifles (typically an AR variant), HK MP5 SMG's, shotguns and sniper weapon systems.

Bike Unit 
The SPD's Bike Unit was the first mountain bike unit in the United States.

In 2005, the department started testing the use of BlackBerry PDAs with bike patrol officers. These PDAs allowed officers on the streets access to police records when the use of regular mobile data computer is not available.

Seattle Metropolitan Police Museum 
The Seattle Metropolitan Police Museum was a museum in the city's Pioneer Square neighborhood. Founded in 1997, it was dedicated to the history of the Seattle Police Department and of law enforcement in the Seattle metropolitan area. It claimed to be the largest police museum in the western United States until its closure in 2017 due to safety concerns because of the ongoing waterfront tunnel project.

See also 

List of law enforcement agencies in Washington (state)
 List of terrorist incidents in Seattle
 List of United States state and local law enforcement agencies
Murder of Timothy Brenton

References

External links 
Seattle Police Department
SPD's listing at Officer Down Memorial Page.
Seattle Metropolitan Police Museum – official site
ACLU timeline of Seattle police accountability

Police
Municipal police departments of Washington (state)
1886 establishments in Washington Territory